Southwick bungalow is a 19th-century building in Southwick, a suburb in Ooty, Tamil Nadu, India.
It was built by the British during their colonization period in India. The residents of this bungalow are Javid Sait and Matheen Sait, sons of the late Yoonus Sait, essa sait son of Saleem sait,Omer Sait, and Mohsin Sait, sons of the late Razzack Sait; Zubair Sait, Suhail Sait, Saad Sait, Abrar Sait, sons of the late Ahmed Sait; Junaid Sait, son of the late Ali Sait, and Rafiq Sait, son of the late Cassim Sait. Their forefathers, who had been living in the bungalow since the 1870s, were collectors of antique items and businessmen with ventures that existed during the British Raj. The present generation deals mostly in the hospitality industry with Junaid Sait running multiple resorts and Saad and Suhail running hotels. The antiquities acquired for the bungalow are many and lie in an area of 15.5 acres within the bungalow. A collection of strongboxes hold treasures, unknown to outsiders.
Junaid Sait recalls

The other artifacts in the bungalow include intricate ivory carvings, an Edison concert phonogram, Inlaid tables, screens, collection of keychains, matchboxes, stamps, coins and stuffed animals.
Another remarkable antique is a billiard table which was imported into India by Dawson & Co. and was the second table in the world on which the game of snooker was played, the game being invented on the table in the Ooty Club. Another remarkable feature of this beautiful ancient bungalow is the nearly 200-year-old tea tree which stands in one of the lawns of the bungalow.

See also
 Mariamman temple, Ooty
 Ooty Golf Course
 Ooty Lake
 St. Stephen's Church, Ooty
 Stone House, Ooty

References

Houses completed in the 19th century
Bungalow architecture
Houses in India
Architecture in the United Kingdom
Buildings and structures in Tamil Nadu